Baltimore County Jail is a historic jail located at Towson in Baltimore County, Maryland, United States.  It was built in 1855 and is a two-story Italianate style stone building, measuring 52 feet wide and 62 feet deep.  It consists of a five-bay-wide warden’s  house with a central three story entry tower.  In the rear is a cell block with three levels of jail cells and covered by a gable roof. The warden's house and tower features a low pyramidal hipped roof and  walls. Attached to the warden's house is a stone garage built in 1940. It was used as a correctional facility until 2006.

It was listed on the National Register of Historic Places on August 26, 2009.

References

External links
, at Maryland Historical Trust

Jails on the National Register of Historic Places in Maryland
Jails in Maryland
Buildings and structures in Baltimore County, Maryland
Italianate architecture in Maryland
Government buildings completed in 1855
Infrastructure completed in 1855
National Register of Historic Places in Baltimore County, Maryland